Hayden Matthew Campbell (born 3 June 2002) is an English professional footballer who plays as a midfielder for  club Marine. 

He began his career at Port Vale before joining Salford City in September 2020. From Salford he was loaned out to Kidsgrove Athletic, Marine, FC United of Manchester, Stalybridge Celtic and Altrincham, before he joined Marine on a permanent basis in August 2022.

Career

Port Vale
Campbell began his career at Port Vale, moving on loan to Northern Premier League Division One South East club Kidsgrove Athletic on 18 December 2019.

Salford City
He signed for Salford City on 23 September 2020. He made his senior debut for the "Ammies" on 10 November, coming on as a 59th-minute substitute for Oscar Threlkeld in a 2–1 victory at Rochdale in the group stages of the EFL Trophy. He moved on loan to Marine in December 2020, making two appearances in all competitions for them.

He moved on loan to Northern Premier League Premier Division club FC United of Manchester in September 2021, and in November was loaned to Stalybridge Celtic. He made his debut against Bootle in the FA Trophy, scoring the opening goal of a 3–3 draw, following which Stalybridge won a penalty shootout.

On 25 March 2022, Campbell joined National League side Altrincham on loan for the remainder of the 2021–22 season. He made three substitute appearances for the club, featuring for a total of 54 minutes. He was released by Salford at the end of the 2021–22 season.

Marine
On 11 August 2022, Campbell signed for Marine, now in the Northern Premier League Premier Division.

Style of play
Campbell is a ball-playing central midfielder who has good passing and distribution skills.

Career statistics

References

2002 births
Living people
Sportspeople from Stafford
English footballers
Port Vale F.C. players
Kidsgrove Athletic F.C. players
Salford City F.C. players
Marine F.C. players
F.C. United of Manchester players
Stalybridge Celtic F.C. players
Altrincham F.C. players
Northern Premier League players
Association football midfielders